Forg may refer to:
 Forg District in Fars Province, Iran
 Forg Rural District in Forg District, Fars Province, Iran

Förg may refer to:
 Günther Förg (1952 – 2013), German painter, graphic designer, sculptor and photographer

FORG may refer to:
 The ticker symbol of ForgeRock